The Michael L. Printz Award is an American Library Association literary award that annually recognizes the "best book written for teens, based entirely on its literary merit". It is sponsored by Booklist magazine; administered by the ALA's young-adult division, the Young Adult Library Services Association (YALSA); and named for the Topeka, Kansas, school librarian Mike Printz, a long-time active member of YALSA.

Up to four worthy runners-up may be designated Honor Books and three or four have been named every year.

History
The Printz Award was founded in 2000 for 1999 young adult publications. The award "was created as a counterpoint to the Newbery" in order to highlight the best and most literary works of excellence written for a young adult audience. 

Jonathon Hunt, a Horn Book reviewer, hopes that the Printz Award can create a "canon as revered as that of the Newbery."

Michael L. Printz was a librarian at Topeka West High School in Topeka, Kansas, until he retired in 1994. He was also an active member of YALSA, serving on the Best Books for Young Adults Committee and the Margaret A. Edwards Award Committee. He dedicated his life to ensuring that his students had access to good literature. To that end he encouraged writers to focus on the young adult audience. He created an author-in-residence program at the high school to promote new talent and encourage his students. His most noteworthy find was Chris Crutcher. Printz died at the age of 59 in 1996.

Criteria and procedure
Source: "The Michael L. Printz Award Policies and Procedures"

The selection committee comprises nine YALSA members appointed by the president-elect for a one-year term. They award one winner and honor up to four additional titles. The term 'young adult' refers to readers from ages 12 through 18 for purposes of this award. The Michael L. Printz Award is sponsored by Booklist, a publication of the American Library Association (ALA).

 Non-fiction, fiction, poetry and anthologies are all eligible to receive the Printz Award.
 Books must have been published between January 1 and December 31 of the year preceding the announcement of the award.
 Titles must be designated 'young adult' by its publisher or published for the age range that YALSA defines as "young adult," i.e., 12 through 18. Adult books are not eligible.
 Works of joint authorship or editorship are eligible.
 The award may be issued posthumously.
 Books previously published in another country are eligible (presuming an American edition has been published during the period of eligibility).

Recipients
The Printz Medal has been awarded to one person annually without exception in its first nineteen years, 2000–2018. No one has won it twice, though some authors have received both the medal and honor books.

Multiple awards 
As of 2022, no writer has won two of the twenty-three Printz Awards. Marcus Sedgwick has written one Award winner and two Honor Books. David Almond, John Green, Geraldine McCaughrean, A. S. King and Gene Luen Yang have written one Award winner and one Honor Book. Eight people have two Honor Books: M. T. Anderson, Margo Lanagan, Terry Pratchett, Marcus Sedgwick, Markus Zusak, Deborah Heiligman, Mariko Tamaki, and Angie Thomas 

Four writers have won both the Printz Award and the annual Carnegie Medal from the British librarians: David Almond, Aidan Chambers, Geraldine McCaughrean, and Meg Rosoff. Chambers alone has won both for the same book, the 1999 Carnegie and 2003 Printz for the novel Postcards from No Man's Land.
In its scope, books for children or young adults (published in the UK), the British Carnegie corresponds to the American Newbery and Printz awards.

See also

American Library Association awards
Newbery Medal — the first children's literary award in the world, inaugurated 1922; after 1999 for American children's distinct from young-adult books
Margaret A. Edwards Award for outstanding lifetime contribution to young-adult literature

References

External links
 ALA Youth Media Awards
 YALSA's Teen Book Finder — free mobile app by ALA

Awards established in 2000
American Library Association awards
American literary awards
Young adult literature awards
English-language literary awards